Every Given Moment is the second and final album by American nu metal band Stereomud. It was released on March 4, 2003 through Loud Records and was manufactured via Columbia Records. The album was the follow-up to their 2001 debut album, Perfect Self, but this album did not impress critics and the band broke up soon after. The song "Show Me" is featured in the video game NASCAR The Game: 2011, and the bonus track "End of Everything" (featured exclusively on the Japanese CD release) is featured in the WWF Forceable Entry album as the theme song of WWE wrestler Raven.

Track listing

Credits 
Erik Rogers – vocals
Corey Lowery – bass, vocals
Joey Zampella – guitar
John Fattoruso – guitar
Dan Richardson – drums
Jamie Muhoberac – keyboards

Production
Produced by John Travis
Engineered by John Travis
Mixed by Jack Joseph Puig
A&R administration – Greg Boggs
Assistant engineer – Pete Martinez
Logo design – Frank Carbonari
Assistant engineer – Chris Steffen
Mastering – Ted Jensen

References

2003 albums
Stereomud albums
Loud Records albums